Sean Townsend (born January 20, 1979 in Temple, Texas) is an American artistic gymnast. He was part of the US Men's gymnastics team at the 2000 Summer Olympics in Sydney, Australia and the 1999 World Artistic Gymnastics Championships team. He was part of the 2001 World Artistic Gymnastics Championships team where he became world champion on Parallel Bars and helped his team win a silver medal in the Team final. He also qualified to the Men's Individual All Around final where he placed 8th.

In 2001, he was a finalist for the James E. Sullivan Award.

References

External links
 
 
 

1979 births
Living people
People from Temple, Texas
American male artistic gymnasts
Gymnasts at the 2000 Summer Olympics
Medalists at the World Artistic Gymnastics Championships
Olympic gymnasts of the United States